Jazz Waltz may refer to:

 Jazz Waltz (Shorty Rogers album), 1963
 Jazz Waltz (Les McCann & The Jazz Crusaders album), 1963